Rajipur is village which is located in District Farrukhabad of Uttar Pradesh, block is Kamlagamj , Tehail Sadar, Farrukhabad, pin code is 209724. 

There is a famous tample name is Kaleshwar nath. there is Also 3 famous temple one is Sitaram Mandir, second is Gama Devi Mandir and 3rd is Kalidevi Mandir. Rajipur is a Nyaypanchayat also a Gram panchayat. there is 5 village include in Rajipur Grampanchayat 1. Kohni Nagla 2. Khajuria Nagla 3. Bariya Nagla 4. Tilak nagar 5. Chan nagria. There was two famous personality of Rajipur first is Swargiya Jadunath Singh Gaharwar ji, Ex. District Board Chairman, Farrukhabad and 2nd is Swargiya Haribabu Dubey, Ex. Block Pramukh Kamalganj. Mrs. Sharda Devi is the Pradhan in present scenario to Rajipur Gram shabha.

History
Census 2011 Rajipur Village Location Code or Village Code 209724. The village of Rajipur is located in the Sadar tehsil of Farrukhabad district in Uttar Pradesh, India.

Demographics
The total geographic area of village is 152.93 hectares. Bara Belun features a total population of 1,920 peoples. There are about 428 houses in Bara Belun village.

Healthcare
Nearest Rural Hospital at CHC Kamalganj (with 60 beds) is the main medical facility in Bhatar CD block. There are primary health centres

References

External links
 Map
 Ratanpur

Villages in Purba Bardhaman district